The Lwów pogrom was a pogrom of the Jewish population of the city of Lwów (since 1945, Lviv, Ukraine) that took place on September 27, 1914, during World War I. Following a reported robbery, or shots, involving the Imperial Russian Army in the Lviv's Jewish quarter, Russian Cossacks assaulted nearby Jewish civilians, resulting in about 40 civilian fatalities and a number of injuries. In the aftermath, no Cossacks were court-martialed, but several Jews were arrested and released shortly afterward.

See also
 Lwów pogrom (1918)
 Lviv pogroms (1941)

References

Anti-Jewish pogroms in the Russian Empire
September 1914 events
1914 in the Russian Empire
1914 in Ukraine
Conflicts in 1918
Conflicts in 1914
Jewish Russian and Soviet history
Jewish Ukrainian history
Jews and Judaism in Lviv
History of Lviv
History of the Cossacks
Mass murder in 1914
World War I massacres
World War I crimes by the Russian Empire
Massacres in 1914
1914 murders in the Russian Empire